Halfway Lake Provincial Park is a provincial park astride Ontario Highway 144 in Sudbury District in northeastern Ontario, Canada. It is operated by Ontario Parks and is named for Halfway Lake, which is entirely within the park grounds. The park contains more than a dozen lakes, including Antrim Lake, Bailey Lake, Benny Lake, Bittern Lake, Burnt Ridge Lake, Halfway Lake, Lodge Lake, Moosemuck Lake, Otter Lake, Raven Lake, Three Island Lake, Trapper Lake, and Two Narrows Lake. There are a mix of 221 electrical and non-electrical sites in the two campgrounds (namely Hawksnest Campground and Wild Rose Campground), 10 interior canoe-access sites located on Antrim Lake, Bailey Lake, and Trapper Lake, plus an additional five interior hike-access sites located along the Hawk Ridge Trail.

References

Sources

External links

Provincial parks of Ontario
Parks in Sudbury District
Protected areas established in 1985
1985 establishments in Ontario